Effingham William Wilson (28 September 1785 – 9 June 1868) was a 19th-century English radical publisher and bookseller. His main interests were in economics and politics, but he also published poetry.

Early life
Wilson was born at Ravensworth in the North Riding of Yorkshire, one of at least five sons to Joseph Wilson (born c.1734) and his wife Jane Hutchinson. Some of his relations had farmed under the Earl of Effingham, which resulted in Wilson's distinctive Christian name. "His earliest years were most happily passed in the neighbourhood of the place of his birth" according to his biography.

When still a boy he was removed to Knaresborough, where he resided with his physician uncle, Dr. Thomas HutchinsonFSA (d. March 1797), to be trained in the medical profession. Dr Hutchinson was "a man of taste and literature" and a friend of William and Dorothy Wordsworth. Also a keen phrenologist, he owned the skull of the murderer Eugene Aram, having taken the head from the gibbet where the murderer hung, and was assisted in the task by Wilson.

Career
A strong advocate of freedom of the press, Wilson published material which other publishers found too politically dangerous, including works by Jeremy Bentham, whose utilitarian tendencies he shared. Other publications included works by William Godwin, Benjamin Disraeli and Robert Owen. After having been a passenger on the first train into London he founded Railway Magazine, the first railway-themed trade journal.

Wilson also published poetry, and was the first publisher of both Alfred, Lord Tennyson and Robert Browning. He also published Thomas Campbell and was an original publisher of William Hazlitt. In 1830 Wilson published Tennyson's Poems Chiefly Lyrical which contained "Claribel", "The Kraken", "The Dying Swan" and "Mariana", which later took their place among Tennyson's most celebrated poems. The publication brought Tennyson to the notice of Samuel Taylor Coleridge, among others.

In 1848 Wilson wrote and published a pamphlet entitled A House for Shakespeare in which he proposed the creation of a national theatre company. This inspired the foundation of the Royal National Theatre. His proposal was supported by Henry Irving, Charles Dickens and Matthew Arnold among others.

General Lafayette sent Wilson a bust of himself and an autographed letter after he published one of his works in translation in London.

Death

The obituary for Wilson in The Hornet said: "at the present time the firm of Effingham Wilson is known throughout the world as one of the foremost houses in the publishing trade." Walter Bagehot, a close personal friend wrote that Wilson "was full of amenity, kindness and cheerfulness. He enjoyed excellent health throughout his long life, and used often to remark that he had lived sixty years in London without a headache." He was a close personal friend of George Birkbeck. His correspondences included John Stuart Mill and Charles Dickens.

He died on 9th June 1868 and was buried on the western side of Highgate Cemetery. His grave (no.10581) no longer has a legible inscription.

The firm was continued by his son Henry Schütz Wilson, before being taken over by Isaac Pitman in 1932 which was taken over in turn by Pearson plc.

References

Further reading
 .
 .

1785 births
1868 deaths
Burials at Highgate Cemetery
English publishers (people)
English book publishers (people)
Consequentialists
Utilitarians
People from Ravensworth
English Protestants
19th-century British businesspeople